

Events
 Thomas Aquinas issued a condemnation by the bishop of France, Étienne Tempier

Births

Deaths

13th-century poetry
Poetry